The 2022 Badminton Asia Championships was a badminton tournament held at the Muntinlupa Sports Complex, Muntinlupa in the Philippines from 26 April to 1 May 2022. The prior tournament was held in 2019, with no tournament held for the ensuing two years due to the COVID-19 pandemic.

Tournament
The 2022 Badminton Asia Championships is the 39th edition of the Badminton Asia Championships. This tournament is hosted by the Philippines Badminton Association, with the sanction of Badminton Asia.

Venue
This international tournament is held at the Muntinlupa Sport Complex in Muntinlupa, Philippines.

Point distribution
This tournament is graded based on the BWF points system for the BWF World Tour Super 1000 event.

Prize money
The total prize money for this year tournament is US$400,000. Distribution of prize money is in accordance with BWF regulations.

Medal summary

Medalists

Medal table

Group stage

Men's singles

Seeds 

 Kento Momota (first round)
 Anthony Sinisuka Ginting (quarter-finals)
 Lee Zii Jia (champion)
 Jonatan Christie (final)
 Lakshya Sen (first round)
 Loh Kean Yew (quarter-finals)
 Srikanth Kidambi (second round)
 Kanta Tsuneyama (quarter-finals)

Finals

Top half

Section 1

Section 2

Bottom half

Section 3

Section 4

Women's singles

Seeds 

 Akane Yamaguchi (final)
 An Se-young (semi-finals)
 Nozomi Okuhara (first round)
 P. V. Sindhu (semi-finals)
 He Bingjiao (quarter-finals)
 Pornpawee Chochuwong (quarter-finals)
 Busanan Ongbamrungphan (first round)
 Sayaka Takahashi (quarter-finals)

Finals

Top half

Section 1

Section 2

Bottom half

Section 3

Section 4

Men's doubles

Seeds 

 Mohammad Ahsan / Hendra Setiawan (second round)
 Takuro Hoki / Yugo Kobayashi (quarter-finals)
 Satwiksairaj Rankireddy / Chirag Shetty (quarter-finals)
 Fajar Alfian / Muhammad Rian Ardianto (semi-finals)
 Aaron Chia / Soh Wooi Yik (final)
 Ong Yew Sin / Teo Ee Yi (second round)
 Choi Sol-gyu / Seo Seung-jae (withdrew)
 Goh Sze Fei / Nur Izzuddin (semi-finals)

Finals

Top half

Section 1

Section 2

Bottom half

Section 3

Section 4

Women's doubles

Seeds 

 Chen Qingchen / Jia Yifan (champions)
 Lee So-hee / Shin Seung-chan (quarter-finals)
 Kim So-yeong / Kong Hee-yong (first round)
 Yuki Fukushima / Sayaka Hirota (semi-finals)
 Nami Matsuyama / Chiharu Shida (quarter-finals)
 Jongkolphan Kititharakul / Rawinda Prajongjai (second round)
 Pearly Tan / Thinaah Muralitharan (quarter-finals)
 Ashwini Ponnappa / N. Sikki Reddy (withdrew)

Finals

Top half

Section 1

Section 2

Bottom half

Section 3

Section 4

Mixed doubles

Seeds 

 Zheng Siwei / Huang Yaqiong (champions)
 Yuta Watanabe / Arisa Higashino (semi-finals)
 Wang Yilyu / Huang Dongping (final)
 Praveen Jordan / Melati Daeva Oktavianti (semi-finals)
 Seo Seung-jae / Chae Yoo-jung (withdrew)
 Tang Chun Man / Tse Ying Suet (first round)
 Tan Kian Meng / Lai Pei Jing (quarter-finals)
 Goh Soon Huat / Shevon Jemie Lai (second round)

Finals

Top half

Section 1

Section 2

Bottom half

Section 3

Section 4

References

External links
 Tournament Link
 Live Score

Badminton Asia Championships
Asian Badminton Championships
Badminton
Badminton tournaments in the Philippines
International sports competitions hosted by the Philippines
2022 in Philippine sport
Sports in Metro Manila
Badminton Asia Championships
Badminton Asia Championships